Paul Gutrecht (born September 5, 1967) is an American psychotherapist who draws on his training, his life experience as a spouse & father, and his prior work in entertainment for use as appropriate in his clinical work.

Personal life
Gutrecht attended Cornell University from 1985 to 1989. Aside from his acting career, Gutrecht attended Antioch University Los Angeles from 2012 to 2013 and became a marriage and family therapist working in Santa Monica, California since 2016. His practice deals mostly with anxiety, anger-alleviation, substance use, communication, marriage enrichment and/or divorce-related issues.
He works with individuals, couples and families, navigating anger, anxiety and depression, dealing with divorce, co-parenting, life transitions and litigation stress reduction. He also works with clients on substance abuse issues, and runs groups on communication skills, family dynamics and self-care.

Filmography

Film

Television

References

External links
 

1967 births
Living people
20th-century American male actors
21st-century American male actors
American male film actors
American male television actors
21st-century American psychologists
Family therapists
Cornell University alumni
Antioch College alumni
20th-century American psychologists